The seventh season of Friends, an American sitcom created by David Crane and Marta Kauffman, premiered on NBC on October 12, 2000. Friends was produced by Bright/Kauffman/Crane Productions, in association with Warner Bros. Television. The season contains 24 episodes and concluded airing on May 17, 2001.

Reception
Collider ranked it #4 on their ranking of the ten Friends seasons, and cited "The One with Monica and Chandler's Wedding" as its best episode. They also wrote that "The One with the Engagement Picture" and "The One with the Vows" were other highlights.

Cast and characters

(In particular, Introduced in season 7 or Only in season 7)

Main cast
 Jennifer Aniston as Rachel Green
 Courteney Cox-Arquette as Monica Geller
 Lisa Kudrow as Phoebe Buffay
 Matt LeBlanc as Joey Tribbiani
 Matthew Perry as Chandler Bing
 David Schwimmer as Ross Geller

Recurring cast
 Elliott Gould as Jack Geller
 Christina Pickles as Judy Geller
 Eddie Cahill as Tag Jones
 Kathleen Turner as Charles Bing
 Morgan Fairchild as Nora Bing
 James Michael Tyler as Gunther
 Maggie Wheeler as Janice Litman
 Cole Sprouse as Ben Geller

Guest stars
 Kristin Davis as Erin
 Hank Azaria as David
 Susan Sarandon as Cecilia Monroe
 Eva Amurri as Dina
 Gabrielle Union as Kristen Lang
 Jason Alexander as Earl
 Denise Richards as Cassie Geller
 Winona Ryder as Melissa Warburton
 June Gable as Estelle Leonard
 Gary Oldman as Richard Crosby
 David Sutcliffe as Kyle
 Jane Sibbett as Carol Willick 
 Stacy Galina as Julie
 Alison Sweeney as Jessica Ashley
 Vince Vieluf as Ned Morse

Episodes

Special

 denotes a "super-sized" 40-minute episode (with advertisements; actual runtime around 28 minutes).

Notes

References

External links

 

07
2000 American television seasons
2001 American television seasons
Friends (season 7) episodes